The 4th New Zealand Contingent was one of ten contingents of New Zealand volunteers for service during the Second Boer War.

History 
It served from April 1900 through to June 1901. The contingent went from New Zealand to Beira, Portuguese East Africa in the SS Gymeric, though there was a "mutiny" on the Gymeric in Lyttelton Harbour on 27 March 1900 over conditions on board. When they arrived in Beira, part of the contingent was sectioned off to form battery units.

The contingent took more than two months to reach the front line, traveling via train and on horseback through Rhodesia and Beira. Between August 1900 and May 1901, the contingent fought several small skirmishes against Boer commandos in northern Transvaal. Their most significant action was to seize an artillery unit and a supply column under the command of General Koos de la Rey, capturing 135 Boer soldiers on 24 March 1901. On 28 January 1901, William Hardham was involved in an action that earned him the Victoria Cross, the only one awarded to a New Zealander in that war.

The Fourth Contingent left South Africa in the SS Tagus in June 1901.

See also 
 List of Second Boer War Victoria Cross recipients
 List of New Zealand units in the Second Boer War

References

Diary of Trooper R. Pearce, 4th N.Z. Regiment, South Africa edited by R. Pearce (1970, Walton NZ, M. Massey)
Harry's letters from the Boer War by Trooper H M York No 1501 (1993, 2 volumes)
The 4th Contingent N.Z. Rough Riders by J Braithwaite (1902, Dunedin)
With the 4th N.Z. Rough Riders by J G Moore (1906, Dunedin)
The `Dandy Forth' Mutiny by Frank Fyfe (1993, Wakelin House) (about the mutiny on Gymeric, Lyttleton, 27 Mar 1900)

External links
New Zealand in the Second Boer War

4th New Zealand Contingent
Military units and formations of New Zealand